Jean-Pierre Pénicaut (1 August 1937 – 26 September 2021) was a French politician.

Pénicaut was born in Amou, Landes, and began his political career as a municipal councilor in Saint-Paul-lès-Dax. After the death of incumbent , he assumed the mayoralty, which he held until 2001. He served on the National Assembly from 1980 to 1993, representing Landes's 2nd constituency on behalf of the Socialist Party.

References

 
1937 births
2021 deaths
Mayors of places in Nouvelle-Aquitaine
Deputies of the 6th National Assembly of the French Fifth Republic
Deputies of the 7th National Assembly of the French Fifth Republic
Deputies of the 8th National Assembly of the French Fifth Republic
Deputies of the 9th National Assembly of the French Fifth Republic
21st-century French politicians
Socialist Party (France) politicians
People from Landes (department)